Ponikwa may refer to the following places:
 Ponikwa, Lower Silesian Voivodeship — a village in south-west Poland.
 Ponikwa, Masovian Voivodeship  — a village in east-central Poland.
 Ponikwa, West Pomeranian Voivodeship  — a village in north-west Poland.
 Ponikwa, now spelled Ponykva — a village in West Ukraine.

See also 
 Ponikva (disambiguation)